Brandon or Brandin Knight may refer to:

 Brandon Knight (American football) (born 1997), American football player
 Brandon Knight (baseball) (born 1975), American baseball player
 Brandon Knight (basketball) (born 1991), American basketball player
 Brandin Knight (born 1981), American basketball coach and former player